Dubois Municipal Airport  is a city-owned, public-use airport located one nautical mile (2 km) southeast of the central business district of Dubois, a city in Clark County, Idaho, United States.

Facilities and aircraft 
Dubois Municipal Airport covers an area of 305 acres (123 ha) at an elevation of 5,123 feet (1,561 m) above mean sea level. It has one runway designated 16/34 with a gravel and dirt surface measuring 4,600 by 100 feet (1,402 x 30 m).

For the 12-month period ending August 4, 2011, the airport had 1,010 aircraft operations, an average of 84 per month: 99% general aviation and 1% military.

References

External links 
 Aerial image as of July 1992 from USGS The National Map
 

Airports in Idaho
Buildings and structures in Clark County, Idaho